Precious Time can refer to:

Precious Time (album), an album by Pat Benatar
"Precious Time" (Van Morrison song), a single by Van Morrison
"Precious Time" (The Maccabees song), a single by The Maccabees
"Precious Time", a song by Night Ranger from their album Feeding off the Mojo